Sir Robert Knollys (1588–1659) was an English politician who sat in the House of Commons between 1614 and 1629.

Knollys was the 2nd son of Richard Knollys of Stanford-in-the-Vale in Berkshire (now Oxfordshire). He matriculated at Oriel College, Oxford on 13 May 1603, aged 15. He was knighted on 12 January 1613. 

In 1614, he was elected Member of Parliament for Abingdon. He was elected MP for Berkshire  in 1621. In 1624 he was elected MP for Abingdon again, and was re-elected in 1625 and 1626. In 1628 he was elected MP for Wallingford  and sat until 1629 when King Charles decided to rule without parliament for eleven years.

Knollys bought Greys Court from his uncle, William Knollys, Earl of Banbury, died at the age of about 70 and was buried on 26 June 1659.

He married Joan, the daughter of Sir John Wolstenholme and left a son and several daughters; one child was Lettice Knollys or Laetitia Knowles, who married Sir John Corbet (1619-64), second of the Corbet baronets of Stoke.

References

 

1588 births
1659 deaths
Alumni of Oriel College, Oxford
People from Rotherfield Greys
People from Vale of White Horse (district)
Robert 1659
Members of the Parliament of England for Berkshire
English MPs 1614
English MPs 1621–1622
English MPs 1624–1625
English MPs 1625
English MPs 1626
English MPs 1628–1629